Louis Febre (born June 21, 1959) is a Mexican born composer, best known for his work on the television series Smallville. He also won an Emmy Award for his score to The Cape in 1997.

Life 

Born in the city of Saltillo, Mexico, Febre composed his first works for the piano at age 8 while studying piano at a private academy in Northern Mexico. In 1973, his family moved to Los Angeles where he continued his study of the piano under the tutelage of Robert Turner and Françoise Régnat.

Febre went on to formal composition study with Lorraine Kimball and Frank Campo. During this period, he wrote several chamber works and other large form compositions.

He is married to Lisa Febre, a Los Angeles-area multi-instrumentalist performer and teacher.

Career 

In 1992, Febre was employed by B-movie company PM Entertainment, where he discovered his true compositional passion: film scoring. In 1996, he met his mentor John Debney, a partnership that would produce successful collaborative efforts such as the movie Doctor Who in 1996 and led to Louis’ first television series The Cape which would earn him an Emmy in 1997 for Best Dramatic Underscore.

Febre has enjoyed success with the movies Swimfan (2002), Tower of Terror (Disney) and a set of Scooby-Doo straight-to-video movies in 2001. He earned an Annie Award nomination for his score for Scooby-Doo and the Alien Invaders. That same year, he won a Pixie Award for the independent short film: Revenge of the Red Balloon. According to some critics, his score for Alien Trespass transcended the tepid reviews of the film itself.  Variety compared it to the classic sci-fi scores of noted composer Bernard Herrmann.

In 2001, Febre collaborated with Steve Jablonsky on the first season of the hit television series Desperate Housewives. As an additional orchestrator, he worked again with John Debney on Cats & Dogs, Jimmy Neutron, the Disney film Chicken Little, Disney World Tokyo, and with Mark Snow on The X-Files (1998).

Smallville 

Febre is probably best known for his work on the hit television series Smallville. With the departure of Mark Snow from Smallville, Febre became the credited composer in season seven. His score reflected the maturation of the series' protagonist, Clark Kent: "as Clark grew emotionally and intellectually more complex, [he] found a need to comment musically on his growth, and as he drew closer to his Superman persona, it became obvious that a 'Superman' theme would be required."

Febre maintains a prominent presence in the Smallville fan community. He is a featured personality on fan sites where he blogs about his process for composing for the show, and several fan magazines have published interviews with him on the subject of score composition for Smallville.

In 2011, Smallville: Score From The Complete Series Vol. 1 with Mark Snow, was released.

Awards

Filmography

Television

Feature films

Video Feature Films

Cable Films

References

External links 

 Louis Febre
 
 Louis Febre interview in Durance Magazine
 Gorfane/Schwartz Agency Louis Febre

American television composers
1959 births
Hispanic and Latino American musicians
Living people
American musicians of Mexican descent
People from Saltillo
Emmy Award winners
Musicians from Coahuila